Polharrow Burn is a small watercourse in Dumfries and Galloway, Scotland, in the historic county of Kirkcudbrightshire. It rises in Loch Harrow and flows towards St John's Town of Dalry before joining the Water of Ken.

Etymology 
Polharrow is a Gaelic name formed from the words poll 'stream' and airbhe 'wall, fence'. The Scots word burn has been added later, when the meaning of poll in the name became opaque. The word airbhe is also found in Loch Harrow. It is not clear if the loch gave rise to the name of the burn or vice versa. Maxwell proposed a derivation meaning 'the bull's burn', taking the second element to be thairbh 'of a bull'. This derivation is considered to be 'unlikely'.

Dance 
It gives its name to a Scottish country dance by the cryptographer and Scottish country dance deviser Hugh Foss, which appeared in his Glendarroch Scottish Country Dance Collection in 1966. He published several volumes of these from his own impress, Glendarroch Press. He lived in his retirement at Glendarroch in St John's Town of Dalry and died in 1971.

References

External links
 Foss, Hugh

Rivers of Dumfries and Galloway